What Have We Become? is a studio album by the former The Beautiful South collaborators Paul Heaton and Jacqui Abbott, which was released on 19 May 2014 through Virgin EMI Records.

It charted at number three in the UK Albums Chart, just behind Michael Jackson's posthumous album Xscape and Coldplay's Ghost Stories at number one. The album was certified Gold by the British Phonographic Industry on 30 October 2015 for sales over 100,000 copies.

The album's first single, "D.I.Y", reached number 75 on the UK Singles Chart, and was added to BBC Radio 2's playlist in April 2014.

The cover painting is by David Storey.

Reception

What Have We Become? received generally positive reviews from music critics. The album received an average score of 76/100 from 14 reviews on Metacritic, indicating "generally favorable reviews".

In his review for AllMusic, David Jeffries wrote that, "Anyone who enjoys their pop with extra wry and some sobering awareness should love What Have We Become?, but it's the Beautiful South faithful who will rightfully gush over the release, as these antiheroes have lost none of their touch or fatalistic flair."

Track listing

Charts

Weekly charts

Year-end charts

References

2014 albums
Albums produced by John Owen Williams (record producer)
Jacqui Abbott albums
Paul Heaton albums